Bo Fuzhun, also Bofuzhun (Chinese language: 勃匐準 Bo-fu-zhun, ruled from 745 CE per Chinese sources) was a ruler of the Turk Shahis. He is only known in name from Chinese imperial accounts and possibly numismatic sources. The identification of his coinage remains conjectural.

Chinese accounts
Bo Fuzhun appears in the Chinese annals of the Old Book of Tang, which record many dynastic events and ethnological information about the polities of Central and Southern Asia in the 6th-8th century, which were nominally under Chinese suzerainty and part of the Protectorate General to Pacify the West. According to the Old Book of Tang, in 745 CE, Fromo Kesaro, king of the Turk Shahis, sent a request to the Chinese court in order to abdicate in favour of his son Bo Fuzun (勃匐準). These events are again recorded in the Chinese annals Jiu Tangshu and Tang Huiyao.

Coinage
According to Kuwayama  the coinage of Bo Fuzhun corresponds to the late Turk Shahi coinage marked "Śrī Vāsudeva", and designed in the style of the coinage of the Sasanian Emperor Khosrow II. These coins follow the design of the coin of Khosrow II (ruled 590-628) issued in his regnal years 26,27,36 and 37. "Vāsudeva" would be a regnal name that he adopted as he obtained the throne of Uddiyana (烏萇國).

Relation with Khingal
There is a possibility that the Khingal of the Arabs, a ruler of the Turk Shahis, is identical with the Bo Fuzhun.

References

Notes

Sources

  
 
 
 

 
 

Turkic dynasties
Dynasties of Afghanistan
Kabul Shahi